John Humphrey (9 February 1837 – unknown) was an English first-class cricketer active 1870–81 who played for the Surrey Club. He was born in Mitcham and was the elder brother of Thomas, William and Richard Humphrey.

References

1837 births
Date of death unknown
English cricketers
Surrey Club cricketers